Clathrina wistariensis is a species of calcareous sponge in the family Clathrinidae from Australia, off the Queensland coast.

References

Clathrina
Animals described in 1999
Sponges of Australia
Taxa named by John Hooper (marine biologist)
Taxa named by Gert Wörheide